Torkofel (2,276 m) is a mountain of the Gailtal Alps in Carinthia, Austria. It is the highest summit of the Jauken Group, a small limestone massif west of Reißkofel. It lies between the Drava valley to the north and the Gail valley in the south. It was first climbed in 1853 by the Johann Festin von Wald and Paul Grohmann.

References

Mountains of the Alps
Mountains of Carinthia (state)